= Slab Creek =

Stream in West Virginia, U.S.

Coordinates: 39°06′34″N 80°59′12″W

Slab Creek is a stream in the U.S. state of West Virginia.

Slab Creek was named for a nearby settler's house which was built of slabs.

== See also ==
- List of rivers of West Virginia
